Sar Howz-e Bala (also Romanized as Sar Ḩowẕ-e Bālā) is a village in Shalal and Dasht-e Gol Rural District, in the Central District of Andika County, Khuzestan Province, Iran. At the 2006 census, its population was 77, in 14 families.

References 

Populated places in Andika County